Assyrians in Armenia (Āsōrīnēr) make up the country's third largest ethnic minority, after Yazidis and Russians. According to the 2011 census, there are 2,769 Assyrians living in Armenia, and Armenia is home to some of the last surviving Assyrian communities in the Caucasus. There were 6,000 Assyrians in Armenia before the dissolution of the Soviet Union, but because of Armenia's struggling economy during the 1990s, the population has been cut by half, as many have emigrated.

History

Modern history

Today's Assyrian population in Armenia are mostly descendants of settlers who came starting in the early nineteenth century during the Russo-Persian War (1826-1828), when thousands of refugees fled their homeland in the areas around Urmia in Persia. In the beginning of the 20th century, many came from what is today Southeastern Turkey, specifically the Hakkari region, where it was common to have Assyrians and Armenians living in the same villages. Assyrians, like their Armenian neighbors, suffered during a genocide by the Ottoman Turks, in which an estimated over 750000 Assyrians perished. As many Armenians fled Anatolia for what is today Armenia, many Assyrians followed as well, citing it as the only "Christian haven" in the region, although many also fled to Georgia (see Assyrians in Georgia). Throughout history, relations between the Assyrians and Armenian majority have tended to be very friendly, as both groups have practiced Christianity since ancient times and have suffered through persecution under Muslim rulers.

In 2020 amid the Nagorno-Karabakh war, many Assyrians from Armenia volunteered to fight for the defense of Artsakh against Azerbaijan. Several Assyrian television channels arrived to Armenia to report the war as well as talk to the Assyrian families who lost their sons in the war.

Distribution

The Assyrian population in Armenia is mainly rural. Out of 3,409 Assyrians in Armenia 2,885 (84.6%) was rural and 524 (15.4%) urban.
According to the Council of Europe European Charter for Regional or Minority Languages there were four rural settlements with significant Assyrian population: 
Arzni in Kotayk Province - Assyrians and Armenians
Verin Dvin, Ararat Province - Assyrians and Armenians
Dimitrov, Ararat Province - Assyrians and Armenians
Nor Artagers in Armavir Province - Assyrians, Armenians and Yezidis

Culture 

The Assyrians have managed to both integrate with Armenian society and maintain their own ethnic identity, as there are classes teaching the Aramaic language. Most Assyrians in the country are fluent in Armenian and Russian as well. Assyrians in Armenia today mostly belong to Assyrian Church of the East, but there is a small community belonging to the Chaldean Catholic Church as well. They mostly work in the fields of gardening, agriculture and viniculture. There are big Assyrian communities in the region of Verin Dvin and Dimitrov of the Ararat Marz, and Arzni of the Kotayk Marz. There is an Assyrian Youth Center in the Armenian capital, Yerevan.

In 2003, the community established the "Assyrian Center BetNahrain", a club that promotes the studying and dissemination of the Assyrian language, culture, history and traditions, to the general public.

Education
There are four  public schools that are providing instructions in Assyrian:
 The Secondary School of Verin Dvin village (250 students in 2008)
 The Secondary School of Arzni village (114 students in 2008)
 The Secondary School of Dimitrov village (68 students in 2008)
 Alexander Pushkin no. 8 secondary School of Yerevan (8 students in 2008)

See also
Armenian-Assyrian relations
Assyrian people
Assyrian diaspora
Assyrian genocide

References

External links
Assyrian Association of Armenia
Nineveh: Assyrian Woman in the Days of Mourning
Three Essential Issues Facing Assyrians in Armenia
The Ethnic Minorities of Armenia Yerevan
The Armenian Term Āsōrī

 
 
Ethnic groups in Armenia
Assyrian diaspora